The Last Dragon (sometimes listed as Berry Gordy's The Last Dragon) is a 1985 American martial arts comedy film produced by Rupert Hitzig for Berry Gordy and directed by Michael Schultz. The film stars Taimak, Vanity, Julius Carry, Christopher Murney, Keshia Knight Pulliam, and Faith Prince. Choreography was created by Lester Wilson and Lawrence Leritz.

The Last Dragon was released in theatres by TriStar Pictures on March 22, 1985. The film was a financial success despite a mixed reception by critics, and is considered a cult classic.

Plot 
In New York City, Leroy Green (also known as "Bruce Leeroy") has dreams of becoming a great martial artist like his idol Bruce Lee. His master explains that he has reached the final level of martial arts accomplishment known as "The Last Dragon." Martial artists who reach this final level are said to be able to concentrate such mystical energy into their hands that they begin to glow. Only a true martial arts master would be able to exhibit "The Glow" over his entire body. Leroy doesn't fully understand and, in possession of a medal supposedly belonging to Bruce Lee, Leroy embarks upon a spiritual journey to find Master Sum Dum Goy, whom his master claims can help Leroy unlock the power of "The Glow."

Another martial artist, Sho'nuff (also known as "The Shogun of Harlem") sees Leroy as the only obstacle to being acknowledged as the true master of martial arts. When Leroy refuses to fight him, a furious Sho'nuff attempts to menace Leroy into accepting his challenge. Accompanied by his minions Crunch, Beast, and Cyclone, Sho'nuff barges into Leroy's martial arts school. The gang assaults Johnny Yu, one of Leroy's students, demanding that Leroy bow before Sho'nuff. Finally, Sho'nuff and company ransack the Green family's pizza restaurant.

Meanwhile, video arcade mogul Eddie Arkadian sends his men to kidnap local VJ Laura Charles, owner of the "7th Heaven" studio, where she films a TV series similar to Soul Train. Eddie hopes to get several trashy music videos he has produced starring his girlfriend Angela Viracco featured on Laura's show. The kidnap attempt is thwarted by Leroy who easily fends off the thugs. He loses his medal during the struggle, which Laura recovers. Later, Leroy witnesses Laura being kidnapped by Arkadian's brutish henchman Rock. A clue left behind reveals that the kidnappers work for Eddie Arkadian Productions.

Laura refuses to promote Angela's video on her program, but as Arkadian's men prepare to coerce her, Leroy suddenly bursts into the room clothed as a Ninja and rescues Laura once again. Back at her apartment, Laura gratefully returns Leroy's medal. Consumed with vengeance, Arkadian hires Sho'nuff to defeat Leroy and takes control of the 7th Heaven studio, capturing Laura and Leroy's younger brother, Richie, who has snuck in hoping to woo Laura.

Posing as a pizza delivery man, Leroy manages to infiltrate the assumed lair of Master Sum Dum Goy within a fortune cookie factory, but is shocked to discover that the "Master" is only a computer churning out cookie fortunes. Leroy consults his former master for answers, but his master suggests that Leroy has known the answers all along.

Not wanting anyone to get hurt in the process of achieving her stardom, Angela leaves Arkadian and asks Johnny to warn Leroy about his plan. As Leroy returns to 7th Heaven, he is ambushed by an army of violent thugs hired by Arkadian. Leroy's students, led by Johnny, charge into the studio to even the odds. Using Laura as bait, Eddie lures Leroy to a dilapidated building where he finally faces off against Sho'nuff. During the battle, Sho'nuff reveals his ability to use "The Glow," his hands pulsating with a red aura, and beats Leroy viciously before attempting to force him to acknowledge Sho'nuff as "The Master." As recent events flash before Leroy's eyes, he realizes that his former Master was correct and that everything he needed to achieve the "Final Level" was within him all along. His entire body bathed in the sublime golden light of "The Glow," Leroy uses his newfound power to defeat Sho'nuff.

Arkadian appears and fires a single bullet which Leroy catches between his teeth before detaining Arkadian for the police. Laura and Leroy are reunited at the studio where the two kiss.

Cast

Production 
Vanity had just left Purple Rain. Gordy signed her to a four-picture contract.

The Last Dragon began production in New York City locations on April 16, 1984. This was the first acting role for Taimak, a then-19-year-old black belt who learned to act on the set of this picture. Reyes, martial artist and actor, made his film debut at the age of twelve in this film. Carry, in the role of Sho'nuff, trained in martial arts for the film. Gordy was frequently on the set and had many of his Motown artists visit. Producer Suzanne de Passe was very hands on with the project. Billy Blanks was at one point considered for the role of Leroy Green as was Wesley Snipes, Mario Van Peebles, Laurence Fishburne and even Denzel Washington.

Notable film locations include the Harlem Karate Institute of Grandmaster Ernest Hyman, Japanese Goju-Ryu, in Harlem, New York City where the Dojo and workout scenes were filmed. The Victory Theater on 42nd Street, which was an adult movie theatre, was used for the scene where Sho'nuff interrupts the viewing of Enter the Dragon. Ron Van Clief choreographed the fight for this scene in which Carry performed his own stunts. Bernstein's-on-Essex, a kosher Chinese restaurant used in the film with its decor intact.

Music 

The film has a soundtrack of the same name and features music supervised by executive producer Berry Gordy. The music was supervised by executive producer Gordy. Featured in this film is a DeBarge song, "Rhythm of the Night," written by Diane Warren. The song reached #3 on the Billboard Hot 100 and #1 on the Billboard R&B charts. The film's Richard Perry-produced title theme was nominated for Worst "Original" Song at the 1985 Golden Raspberry Awards, as was Vanity's song "7th Heaven."

A song that was not featured but still benefited from critical acclaim was "Upset Stomach," written and performed by Stevie Wonder. It also marked the return of Willie Hutch to Motown with the song "The Glow." Charlene performed the song "Fire" for the soundtrack. The score was composed by Segal. The love theme song called "First Time on a Ferris Wheel" was also composed by Segal and performed by Smokey Robinson and Syreeta.

Reception 
The film's total gross is reported as $33 million against a production budget of $10 million.
On Rotten Tomatoes it has a 59% approval rating based on reviews from 22 critics. The site's consensus reads: "The Last Dragon is a flamboyant genre mashup brimming with style, romance, and an infectious fondness for kung fu, but audiences may find the tonal whiplash more goofy than endearing."

Neil Gaiman reviewed The Last Dragon for Imagine magazine, and stated that "Will black Kung Fu whiz 'Bruce' Leroy find The Master, defeat wicked Eddie Arcadian, beat Sho-Nuff ('The Shogun of Harlem'), rescue the lovely Laura (Vanity), outsmart the jive-talking Chinese fortune-cookie people, and learn how to get down and boogie? Very probably."

In 2002, a paper in the Journal of Asian American Studies applauded the strong character development of the black hero, who reverses the stereotype of the typical Asian in an action film. The hero, while learning from an Asian Zen master, learns to use his internal strength and aura to overcome obstacles.

References

External links 
 
 
 

1985 films
1980s action comedy films
1985 martial arts films
1980s musical comedy films
African-American comedy films
American action comedy films
1980s English-language films
Films directed by Michael Schultz
Films set in a movie theatre
Films set in New York City
Films shot in New York City
Jeet Kune Do films
Karate films
Kung fu films
Motown Productions films
Ninja films
TriStar Pictures films
American martial arts films
American vigilante films
1985 comedy films
1980s American films